Jumbo Mountain, sometimes called Mount Jumbo, is a 3,437 meter (11,276 ft) elevation mountain summit located  west-southwest of Invermere in the Purcell Mountains of southeast British Columbia, Canada. The nearest higher peak is Mount Farnham,  to the north-northeast, and Karnak Mountain is set  to the west. Jumbo and Karnak form a double summit massif which is the second-highest mountain in the Purcells, and fourth-highest in the Columbia Mountains. The first ascent of Jumbo Mountain was made August 4, 1915, by H.O. Frind, A.H. & E.L. MacCarthy, M & W.E. Stone, B. Shultz, and Conrad Kain via the North/Northeast Slopes. The peak was named by Edward Warren Harnden after the 1892 Jumbo Mineral Claim on nearby Toby Creek, which in turn was named for Jumbo the elephant. The mountain's toponym was officially adopted March 31, 1924, when approved by the Geographical Names Board of Canada.

Climate

Based on the Köppen climate classification, Jumbo Mountain is located in a subarctic climate zone with cold, snowy winters, and mild summers. Winter temperatures can drop below −20 °C with wind chill factors  below −30 °C. Precipitation runoff from the mountain drains into south into Jumbo Creek which is a tributary of Toby Creek, and meltwater from the Jumbo Glacier on its north slope drains into Horsethief Creek which, like Toby Creek, is also a tributary of the Columbia River.

Climbing Routes
Established climbing routes on Jumbo Mountain:

 North/Northeast slopes - First ascent 1915
 West Ridge - First ascent 1974

See also

Geography of British Columbia

References

External links
 Weather: Jumbo Mountain
 Jumbo Mountain aerial photo: PBase
 Commander-Jumbo-Karnak aerial photo: PBase

Three-thousanders of British Columbia
Purcell Mountains
Columbia Mountains
Columbia Country
Kootenay Land District